G.I. Wanna Home is a 1946 short subject directed by Jules White starring American slapstick comedy team The Three Stooges (Moe Howard, Larry Fine and Curly Howard). It is the 94th entry in the series released by Columbia Pictures starring the comedians, who released 190 shorts for the studio between 1934 and 1959.

Plot
At the end of World War II, the Stooges are discharged from the service and return home. They are prepared to marry their fiancées (Judy Malcolm, Ethelreda Leopold, and Doris Houck), but are dispossessed. The boys search around for a room to rent, and hit blind alley after blind alley until finally settling for an open-lot-turned living quarters. Complications take place, involving a lawn mower, which Curly uses as a vacuum cleaner, gets neglected, causing the bag to fill up, and explode. Also an attempt to retrieve eggs from a birds nest, go wrong, when they drop into Moe's hands, cracking them. A struggle with a rifle does succeed in killing a bird for food, However, a parrot gets into the cooked bird, haunting the stooges. A farmer on a tractor plows down the boys' domicile, causing the stooges to flee.

Afterwards, the Stooges build a pathetically small apartment from "their own little hands", with the living room, dining room, and kitchen cramped into the space of a den, plus a small area used as a bedroom with 2 sets of bunk beds, and a small bathroom.

Cast

Credited
 Moe Howard as Moe
 Larry Fine as Larry
 Curly Howard as Curly
 Judy Malcolm as Tessie
 Ethelreda Leopold as Jessie
 Doris Houck as Bessie

Uncredited
 Symona Boniface as Landlady
 Al Thompson as Hobo
 Richard Kening as Landlord
 William Gordon as Man on tractor
 Jerry Kingstone as Cop (deleted scenes)
 Dee Smith as Housewife (deleted scenes)

Production notes
G.I. Wanna Home is often inadvertently referred to as 'G.I. Wanna Go Home.' In the scene where the eggs fall from the tree on Moe’s face, faint laughter can be heard apparently from a production member.

Curly's illness
G.I. Wanna Home was filmed on March 22–26, 1946, near the end of Curly Howard's career. The 42-year-old comedian had suffered a series of minor strokes several months prior to filming, and his performances had been unpredictable. By the time of G.I. Wanna Home, he had lost a considerable amount of weight, and lines had creased his baby face. While director Edward Bernds devised ways to cover his illness, Jules White simply shifted the action towards Larry. The scene where Larry climbs the tree to grab eggs from a bird's nest would normally have revolved around Curly climbing up the tree. In addition, Curly could no longer ad lib for the camera as in previous instances. His scene where he cleans potatoes is sluggish and lethargic. Films like Playing the Ponies, An Ache in Every Stake, Sock-a-Bye Baby, and I Can Hardly Wait are finer examples of Curly preparing food and creating comedy genius with little effort.

References

External links
 
 
G.I. Wanna Home at threestooges.net

1946 films
1946 comedy films
1946 short films
American black-and-white films
Films directed by Jules White
The Three Stooges films
American World War II films
Columbia Pictures short films
American comedy films
1940s English-language films
1940s American films